The brand is now called Figaret Paris  and is a French luxury shirt brand.

Overview
It was launched in 1968 by Alain Figaret. The first boutique was opened in Biarritz (France), then in 1970 the brand opened a store in rue de Longchamp in Paris under the name of Princeton. The first shop devoted entirely to shirts was opened in 1976 in the Rue de la Paix, and is now the brand's flagship store. It is one of the few international brands that has control over the entire process of sourcing, production and distribution in their own boutiques worldwide. Since 2006, the Descours Family has joined the Figaret family as a partner.  In early 2008, the remaining members of the Figaret family have sold their shares to the Descours Family, as of today the Figaret family is not involved with the brand anymore .

The Figaret Online Store was launched in April 2006. There are now 30 Figaret boutiques in France and 1 in Japan.

References

External links
Figaret Official Website

Clothing brands
Clothing companies of France
Companies based in Paris